Like all municipalities of Puerto Rico, Aguada is subdivided into administrative units called barrios, which are roughly comparable to minor civil divisions, (and means wards or boroughs or neighborhoods in English). The barrios and subbarrios, in turn, are further subdivided into smaller local populated place areas/units called sectores (sectors in English). The types of sectores may vary, from normally sector to urbanización to reparto to barriada to residencial, among others.

List of sectors by barrio

Aguada barrio-pueblo

Calle Ermita
Calle Manuel Ruíz González
Calle Paz
Hogar Love and Care
Residencias de Colores
Ruíz González
Sector California
Sector Rosario
Urbanización Moropó
Urbanización San Cristóbal
Urbanización Montemar

Asomante

Apartamentos Portales del Navegante
Avenida Rotario 
Carretera 416
Carretera 417
Égida Hogar Mi Casita Feliz
Hogar María del Carmen 
Parcelas Las Minas 
Reparto Bonet
Residencial Aguada Gardens 
Residencial Los Almendros 
Sector Acevedo
Sector Brisas de Coloso
Sector Colinas del Valle 
Sector Corozas
Sector Cuesta Los Chicharrones
Sector Las Guabas
Sector Los Quiñones
Sector Muñiz
Sector Rosario
Sector Vargas
Sector Vertedero
Sector Villa Alameda
Sector Villarrubia
Urbanización Los Flamboyanes
Urbanización San Francisco
Urbanización y Extensión Jardines de Aguada 
Urbanización y Extensión San José

Atalaya

Sector Juanito Abreu 
Sector Los Concepción
Sector Los Cordero
Sector Los Rodríguez
Sector Matias
Sector Pedro Ruíz
Tramo Carretera 411

Carrizal

Comunidad Las Flores
Égida Hogar Emmanuel Community Home
Parcelas Palmar Novoa Nuevas
Sector Aponte
Sector El Mameyito 
Sector Hormigonera
Sector La Vía
Sector Punta Boquerón
Sector Tablonal
Urbanización Villa Camaly

Cerro Gordo

Comunidad Aislada
Hogar La Igualdad Inc.
Sector Claudio Miranda 
Sector Concho Pérez
Sector David Acevedo
Sector Gabino Negrón
Sector García
Sector Gil Feliciano
Sector Hotel Paraíso
Sector Ito López
Sector Juan Ramírez
Sector La Cadena
Sector La Ceiba
Sector Lalo Ruiz
Sector Lolo Pepe
Sector Marcelino “Lin” Vega
Sector Marcos Rojas
Sector Mariano Concepción
Sector Morales
Sector Nino López
Sector Patricio Vega
Sector Quebrada Larga
Tramo Carretera 110

Cruces

Sector 4 Esquinas
Sector Chago Mero 
Sector Chelo Matías
Sector Cruces
Sector El Calvario
Sector El Túnel
Sector Gelin Soto
Sector Goyito Muñiz
Sector Guillo Goyco
Sector Juan Cardona 
Sector Juan Soto
Sector La Sombra 
Sector Las Cruces
Sector Lino Morales
Sector Lino Ríos
Sector Muñoz
Sector Rito Ríos
Sector Rufino Pérez
Sector Tildo López

Espinar

Brisas de Espinar (Solares) 
Parcelas Pastos Comunales
Sector El Caracol
Sector Hernández Ramírez
Sector Hoyo Frío
Sector La Playa 
Sector Marcial
Sector Río Culebrinas

Guanábano

Parcelas Luyando
Sector Beníquez 
Sector Coloso
Sector David Miranda
Sector Las Bimbas
Sector Militar

Guaniquilla

Apartamentos Aguada Elderly 
Apartamentos Villarena Resort
Calle Estación
Urbanización Montemar
Condominio Bahía Azul 
Condominio Elderly Apartments
Extensión Los Robles
Parcelas Palmar Novoa
Reparto González
Reparto Los Maestros
Reparto Minerva
Residencial Los Robles
Reparto Hernández
Sector Casualidad 
Sector Jaguey
Sector Pico de Piedra
Sector Pitusa o Tramo Carretera 115
Sector Tosquero
Sector Valle del Atlántico
Sector Villa Santoni
Tramo Carretera 441 
Urbanización Alturas de Aguada
Urbanización Isabel La Católica
Urbanización Pública Francisco Egipciaco

Guayabo

Avenida Nativo Alers
Condominio Mar Azul 
Condominio Ocean View Castle
Extensión Casualidad
Sector El Palmar
Sector El Túnel 
Sector Hacienda El Palmar
Sector Juan Cardona
Sector La Mora
Sector Las Cruces
Sector Miguel A. Ruíz
Sector Pancho Agudo
Sector Pascual Muñoz
Sector Rosario
Sector Silva
Tramo Carretera 115
Urbanización El Palmar
Urbanización Villas del Palmar

Jagüey

Sector Colombani
Sector Cordero
Sector Galicia 
Sector Gilberto Orama
Sector Jagüey Bajío
Sector Jagüey Chiquito
Sector La Posada
Sector Miguel A. Ruíz
Sector Parada 5
Sector Parada Galicia
Sector Parada Morales 
Sector Pepe Vargas
Sector Perfecto González
Sector Villa de la Paz
Tramo Carretera 403

Lagunas

Sector Anselmo González
Sector Atalaya III
Sector Cabo Díaz
Sector Canal 44
Sector Carlos Concepción
Sector Carlos Ruíz
Sector Clotilde Chaparro
Sector Cordero
Sector Dos Vistas
Sector El Deportivo
Sector El Jibarito
Sector El Mangoito
Sector El Río
Sector Gavina Mendoza
Sector Jacob Méndez
Sector Juan Tola
Sector La Paloma
Sector Los Crespo
Sector Los Méndez
Sector Manuel Echevarría
Sector Néctar Rodríguez
Sector Papo Feliciano
Sector Parada García
Sector Pedro Cáceres
Sector Pepe Moreno
Sector Piedra Gorda
Sector Pilar Figueroa
Sector Pin Orama
Sector Rubén Rosa
Sector Ruíz
Sector Sico Vega

Mal Paso

Apartamentos Piedras Blancas
Parcelas Cornelias
Parcelas Las Minas
Sector Avilés
Sector Bucaré 
Sector Cáceres
Sector César Ruíz
Sector Chevo Sánchez
Sector El Criollito 
Sector Los Bimbas
Sector Militar
Sector Rosa
Sector Sabana
Sector Sony Hill
Sector Tatín Varela
Sector Vadi
Sector Villarrubia
Urbanización Colinas Vista Azul

Mamey

Carretera 110
Sector Acevedo
Sector Adrián López
Sector Cordero
Sector Hito Acevedo
Sector La Cocorita 
Sector Los Jiménez 
Sector Los Ratones
Sector Nango Soto 
Sector Pablo López
Sector Patrio Acevedo
Sector Plan Bonito
Sector Solares Pabón
Sector Tony Cortez
Tramo Carretera 4417

Marías

Sector Botti
Sector Delfín Cortés
Sector Eloy Villanueva
Sector Gabino López
Sector Hoyo Frío
Sector Julio Nieves
Sector La Viuda Negrón
Sector Las Bambúas
Sector Lelo Villanueva
Sector Los Ratones
Sector Pablo López
Sector Pedro López
Sector Wilson Hernández

Naranjo

Sector 3 Copas
Sector Berto Vargas
Sector Ceferino Acevedo
Sector Cuchilla
Sector El Coquí
Sector El Lirio
Sector El Manantial
Sector Foro Soto
Sector González 
Sector Guillermo Matías
Sector Juan Tita
Sector La Cadena
Sector Lencho Pérez
Sector Leo Fora
Sector Militar 
Sector Mingo Echevarría
Sector Moncho Pérez
Sector Naranjo Abajo
Sector Naranjo Arriba 
Sector Tano Villarrubia

Piedras Blancas

Hogar Love and Care
Los González
Paseo Las Flores
Sector Bajura
Sector Cáceres
Sector Chuco Ramos
Sector Jiménez
Sector Juana Torres
Sector La Roca
Sector Los Matos
Sector Los Pinos 
Sector Manolo Chaparro
Sector Parada Morales
Sector Pepe Rivera
Sector Pitirre
Sector Rosario
Sector Rufino Sánchez
Tramo Carretera 411
Urbanización Las Casonas
Urbanización Villa Ofelia
Urbanización Villas de Sotomayor

Río Grande

Parcelas Matías
Parcelas Nieves
Sector Rosado
Sector Tres Tiendas
Sector Valentín

See also

 List of communities in Puerto Rico

References

Aguada
Aguada